Mila Kunis is an American actress who began her career by appearing in several television series and commercials before playing Jackie Burkhart on the television series That '70s Show. In December 1999, she began voicing Meg Griffin on the animated series Family Guy. Subsequent film roles included Mona Sax in Max Payne, Solara in The Book of Eli, Jamie in Friends with Benefits, Lori in the comedy Ted, and Theodora in Oz the Great and Powerful. Her performance as Lily in Black Swan gained her worldwide accolades, including receiving the Marcello Mastroianni Award for Best Young Actor or Actress at the 67th Venice International Film Festival, and nominations for a Golden Globe Award for Best Supporting Actress and a Screen Actors Guild Award for Outstanding Performance by a Female Actor in a Supporting Role.

Film

Television

Video games

Music videos

References

External links 
 Mila Kunis at Turner Classic Movies
 

Actress filmographies
American filmographies